Sardinian Vendetta (Italian: Vendetta... sarda) is a 1952 Italian comedy film directed by Mario Mattoli and starring Walter Chiari, Carlo Croccolo and Giovanna Pala.  It as shot at the Icet Studios in Milan and the Ponti-De Laurentiis Studios in Rome. The film's sets were designed by the art director Alberto Boccianti.

Synopsis
A Sardinian working as a chef in Milan returns to the island believing that he has inherited money from his uncle. Once there he discovers that he has been killed by a rival family, and he quickly finds himself drawn into a local vendetta.

Cast
 Walter Chiari as Gualtiero Porcheddu
 Carlo Croccolo as Pinuccio
 Mario Riva as Mario
 Giovanna Pala as 	Lulù
 Carlo Campanini as Ottavio
 Franca Marzi as 	Annesa Leoni
 Benedetta Rutili as Efisia Leoni
 Anna Maestri as 	Gavina Leoni
 Furio Meniconi as 	Primo fratello Leoni
 Angelo Dessy as Secondo fratello Leoni
 Ughetto Bertucci as 	Terzo fratello Leoni
 Mario Feliciani as	Zio Porchiddu
 Dorian Gray as Columba Porchiddu
 Rita Andreana as Seconda sorella Porchiddu
 Primarosa Battistella as 	Terza sorella Porchiddu
 Mariano Laurenti as 	Rinaldu, fidanzato di Columba
 Guglielmo Inglese as Cavalier Rossetti
 Alberto Sorrentino as Narciso Bellezza
 Giorgio Bixio as Commendatore genovese
 Totò Mignone as 	Lift all'albergo sardo
 Mimo Billi as 	Capostazione di Dente di Canu
 Silvana Jachino as Guardarobiera

References

Bibliography
 Aprà, Adriano. The Fabulous Thirties: Italian cinema 1929-1944. Electa International, 1979.
 Urban, Maria Bonaria. Sardinia on Screen: The Construction of the Sardinian Character in Italian Cinema. Rodopi,  2013.

External links

1952 films
1952 comedy films
1950s Italian-language films
Italian black-and-white films
Films directed by Mario Mattoli
Films shot in Sardinia
Films set in Sardinia
Films set in Milan
Italian comedy films
1950s Italian films